Adam and Eve and Pinch Me may refer to:
 Adam and Eve and Pinch-Me, 1921 short story collection by A. E. Coppard
 Adam and Eve and Pinch-Me (Johnston novel), 1994 novel by Julie Johnston
 Adam and Eve and Pinch Me (Rendell novel), 2001 novel by Ruth Rendell